The Rapid Attack Identification Detection Reporting System, also known as RAIDRS is a ground-based space control system that provides near real-time event detection.

Mission
RAIDRS will be a family of systems being designed to detect, report, identify, locate, and classify attacks against military space assets. RAIDRS will include detection sensors, information processors, and a reporting architecture. The RAIDRS system will detect and report attacks on both ground and space-based elements of operational space systems. It will notify operators and users, and carry information to decision-makers

Block 10
 Worldwide network of sensors; Centralized management
 Detect, Identify, Characterize SATCOM EMI interference
 Identify signal characteristics
 Geo-locate SATCOM EMI (Electro-Magnetic Interference)
 Report interference on blue space systems and/or services

Block 20
 Commander's decision support tool that provides Defensive Counterspace (DCS) attack assessment
 Integrates and processes critical Space Situation Awareness (SSA) information to provide the integrated space picture that enables DCS operations
 Multi-level distributed data fusion; Advanced visualization

Contract Information

The RAIDRS system is unique in the acquisitions process for being tailored to small businesses and utilizing commercial off-the-shelf (COTS) hardware and software.

According to the Air Force budget, the service intends to spend about $16 million in 2005 on the RAIDRS program; $16.4 million in 2006; $12.1 million in 2007; $12.4 million in 2008; and $66.6 million in 2009.

Contractor:
Kratos Defense & Security Solutions

Locations
 Peterson AFB, Colorado (2007–present) (Central Operating Location)

References

 16th Space Control Squadron
 380th Space Control Squadron

External links
 21st Space Wing Factsheet: 16th Space Control Squadron
 "U.S. Air Force System to Pinpoint Interference Sources", Space News 15 Nov 2004
 Air War College: Space Acquisition Projects
 "New squadron activates at Peterson", 21st Space Wing Public Affairs, 21 May 2007
 Space and Missile Systems Center: Transforming Military Space, 30 Nov 2006
 DefenseTech.org: "Pentagon's Plans for Space Control", 26 Jan 2007

Military space program of the United States
Equipment of the United States Air Force